Kahala may refer to:

Kāhala, Hawaii, neighborhood of Honolulu, Hawaii, United States
Kahala Hotel & Resort, a luxury resort in Kāhala, Hawaii
Kahala Mall, an enclosed shopping mall in Kāhala, Hawaii
Kahala, Harju County, village in Kuusalu Parish, Harju County, Estonia
Lake Kahala, lake in Kuusalu Parish
Kahala, Koigi Parish, village in Koigi Parish, Järva County, Estonia
Kahala, Türi Parish, village in Türi Parish, Järva County, Estonia
Kahala Brands, an American food company
Kahala, the Hawaiian name of Seriola rivoliana, a fish of Hawaii
Tomomi Kahala (born 1974), Japanese J-pop singer

See also
Kabala (disambiguation)